Karen Volkman (born January 1967, in Miami Beach, Florida) is an American poet.

Life
She was educated at New College of Florida, Syracuse University, and the University of Houston.

Her poems have appeared in anthologies including The Best American Poetry, and The Pushcart Prize XXVII.

She has taught at several universities, including the University of Alabama, University of Pittsburgh, University of Chicago, and Columbia College Chicago. She currently lives in Missoula, and teaches in the MFA writing program at the University of Montana-Missoula.

Awards
 Spar, winner of the James Laughlin Award and the Iowa Poetry Prize
 Crash's Law, selected for the National Poetry Series by Heather McHugh.

Work

Poetry books

Essays

References

External links
 "Octaves, Ovations: A Conversation with Karen Volkman ", winter 2003
 An Interview With Poet Karen Volkman", Nick Twemlow, 4.12.02, Poets & Writers
 'Karen Volkman's "nomina"', January 04, 2009, Adam Fieled blog
 Karen Volkman Featured poet at alittlepoetry.com

New College of Florida alumni
Syracuse University alumni
University of Houston alumni
University of Montana faculty
University of Alabama faculty
University of Pittsburgh faculty
University of Chicago faculty
Columbia College Chicago faculty
1967 births
Living people
American women poets
21st-century American poets
American women academics
21st-century American women writers